Miercurea Sibiului is a town in the west of Sibiu County, in southern Transylvania, central Romania,  to the west of the county capital, Sibiu.

Administration
Miercurea Sibiului was declared a town in 2004 and it is one of the smallest and least urbanised ones in the country.

The town administers two villages:

Also, 5 km away there is a small spa town, Băile Miercurea.

At the 2011 census, 83.1% of inhabitants were Romanians, 14.7% Roma, and 1.9% Germans.

Geography
The town lies on the contact area between the Transylvanian Plateau and the Cindrel Mountains, a massif in the Parâng Mountains group in the Southern Carpathians, on a small depression formed by the Secaș River. The river Dobârca is a left tributary of the Secaș that flows through the eponymous village. The river Apold and its left tributary, the Rod, flow through the village Apoldu de Sus.

Miercurea Sibiului has the following neighbors: to the north, the villages  Boz, Drașov, and Cunța in Alba County; to the west, the villages Câlnic, Reciu, and Gârbova in Alba County; to the south, the communes Poiana Sibiului, Tilișca, and Jina in Sibiu County; and to the east, the village Aciliu and the commune Apoldu de Jos in Sibiu County.

The town is situated on a main Romanian road link: the DN1 road between Sibiu and Sebeș, E68/E81 European routes. Miercurea Sibiului is also situated on the Căile Ferate Române Line 200, which runs from Brașov to Curtici.

History

The area was inhabited in ancient times by the Dacians; ox-headed Dacian bracelets from the Iron Age have been found in Apoldu de Sus village.

Since the 12th or 13th century the town was inhabited by Transylvanian Saxons and from 1355 it became one of the original seven seats of Saxondom from the Sibiu area.

Other natives include:

 Victor Capesius (1907–1985), Nazi SS-Sturmbannführer at Dachau and Auschwitz 
  (b. 1973), engineer
 Cornel Medrea (1888–1964), sculptor
  (1889–1958), military officer

Education
There is one secondary school in Miercurea Sibiului: the Ilie Măcelariu Technological High School.

Image gallery

References

External links

  page on www.sibiu.hermannstadt.ro/
  history page on County Council website
  info page on County Council website
  Transylvanian Saxons of Reußmarkt (Miercurea Sibiului)

Towns in Romania
Populated places in Sibiu County
Localities in Transylvania
Spa towns in Romania